Bumi Wali Football Club (simply known as Bumi Wali FC or BWFC) is an Indonesian football club based in Tuban Regency, East Java. They currently compete in the Liga 3.

References

External links
 

Tuban Regency
Football clubs in Indonesia
Football clubs in East Java
Association football clubs established in 2017
2017 establishments in Indonesia